Vladimirs Morozovs (born 21 April 1966) is a Latvian weightlifter. He competed in the men's flyweight event at the 1996 Summer Olympics.

References

External links
 

1966 births
Living people
Latvian male weightlifters
Olympic weightlifters of Latvia
Weightlifters at the 1996 Summer Olympics
Sportspeople from Riga